Strength of the Pines is 1922 American silent drama film directed by Edgar Lewis and starring William Russell, Irene Rich and Lule Warrenton. The film is sometimes referred to by the slightly altered title The Strength of the Pines.

Cast
 William Russell as Bruce Duncan
 Irene Rich as 	Linda
 Lule Warrenton as Elmira Ross
 Arthur Morrison as Bill Turner
 Les Bates as 	Simon Turner

References

Bibliography
 Connelly, Robert B. The Silents: Silent Feature Films, 1910–36, Volume 40, Issue 2. December Press, 1998.
 Munden, Kenneth White. The American Film Institute Catalog of Motion Pictures Produced in the United States, Part 1. University of California Press, 1997.

External links
 

1922 films
1922 drama films
1920s English-language films
American silent feature films
Silent American drama films
Films directed by Edgar Lewis
American black-and-white films
Fox Film films
Films based on American novels
1920s American films